The Lost Honor of Kathryn Beck is a 1984 television film directed by Simon Langton. The film, starring Marlo Thomas and Kris Kristofferson, is based on the 1974 novel The Lost Honour of Katharina Blum by Heinrich Böll, and has been released on VHS under the title Act of Passion.

Plot 
Kathryn Beck is the owner of a small catering business in small-town America who spends the night with a man named Ben Cole, who unknown to her is a suspected bank robber and Weatherman terrorist. After he leaves, the police burst into her house, hold her as a witness and ridicule her. When the media report about her rendezvous, and call her a terrorist lover, Kathryn must try her best to save her image.

Cast
Marlo Thomas as Kathryn Beck
Kris Kristofferson as Ben Cole
George Dzundza as Lt. DeCarlo
Jon DeVries as Bob Fuhrman
David Rasche as Donald Catton
Linda Thorson as Cory Fuhrman
Edward Winter as Carl Macaluso
Randy Rocca as Detective Gary Astarte
Christine Estabrook as Janet Reiss
Steven Williams as Les Averback
Ron Parady as James McLandish

Production
Marlo Thomas, who served as an executive producer, pitched the story to CBS and personally recruited Kris Kristofferson for the male lead. In an interview, she said that the role was written with him in mind; she gave him the script at 7 pm; according to her, he called her at midnight to accept the role.

References

External links

1984 television films
1984 films
1984 drama films
American drama films
Films based on German novels
Films based on works by Heinrich Böll
Films scored by Laurence Rosenthal
Films shot in Chicago
Films directed by Simon Langton
1980s English-language films
1980s American films